The 2022 Asia Artist Awards (Korean: 2022 아시아 아티스트 어워즈), the 7th edition, presented by Star News and Media Boy, which took place on December 13, 2022 at Nippon Gaishi Hall, Nagoya, Japan. It was hosted by Jang Won-young and Leeteuk, broadcast on Star Live on December 13, 2022 at 16.00 (KST). The ceremony featured 35 singers and 18 actors representing Korea.

Winners and nominees

Winners will be listed first and emphasized in bold.

References

External links
 

Awards established in 2016
South Korean music awards
South Korean television awards
Annual events in Japan